The U.S. Embassy in Austria is located in Vienna. Since 2022, the United States Ambassador to Austria is Victoria Reggie Kennedy.
The Austrian Embassy in the U.S. is located in Washington, D.C. Since 2019, the Austrian Ambassador to the United States is Martin Weiss.

History

History of relations prior to World War I 
The Archduchy of Austria never held any colonies in the Americas. Nevertheless, a few Austrians did settle in what would become the United States prior to the 19th Century, including a group of fifty families from Salzburg, exiled for being Lutherans in a predominantly Catholic state, who established their own community in Ebenezer, Georgia in 1734.

Austria stayed neutral during the American Revolutionary War, eventually joining the First League of Armed Neutrality, a league of European states organized by Catherine the Great of Russia during the war to protect neutral shipping, which was often under the threat of being seized or interrupted by the Royal Navy.

Austria, as the epicenter of an empire ruled by a monarch, was initially reluctant to support the American Revolution, given that the goal of the revolution was to liberate a group of colonies from the tyrannical rule of a foreign monarch. The Continental Congress had tried to establish diplomatic relations in 1777 by sending William Lee to Vienna, but the Austrian government did not officially receive him. Eventually, Austria did officially recognize the United States as an independent country when, in 1797, Conrad Frederick Wagner was accepted as U.S. Consul at Trieste.

U.S. diplomats to Austria served in the Habsburg-held cities of Trieste and Venice before an American consulate was established in Vienna on October 10, 1829 (followed by the establishment of a U.S. legation in Vienna headed by Henry A.P. Muhlenberg in 1838, with the elevation to embassy status occurring in 1902). The United States and the Austrian Empire signed a treaty regarding commerce and navigation in 1829. An Austrian legation headed by Baron de Mareschal arrived in Washington, D.C. in 1838.

Serious strains occurred in the relations between the two countries as a result of the Revolutions of 1848. Professor Stephen Tuffnell states:
In its frequent and blundering breaches of etiquette with the Habsburgs, American domestic politics were, as ever, catalytic. Thus, as national-separatist revolutions broke open across the European continent in 1848, ebullient support of Lajos Kossuth and the Hungarian 48ers in the United States drove Washington and Vienna into conflict. Pro-Hungarian fervour in the Senate and Democratic press, stoked by Lewis Cass; State Department flirtation with the recognition of Hungarian independence in the Taylor and Fillmore Presidencies; and, finally, the latter's 1851 'rescue' of Kossuth from the Ottoman Empire on board the USS Mississippi precipitated a breach in relations. Only the death of Daniel Webster, a major opponent of reconciliation, averted the crisis.

Both Austria-Hungary and the United States were part of the Eight-Nation Alliance that intervened in the Boxer Rebellion in China from 1899 to 1901.

Over two million people from the Austro-Hungarian Empire immigrated to the United States throughout the 19th Century, though because of the empire's multi-ethnic status, it is difficult to determine how many of these immigrants were ethnic Austrians. By 1900, over 275,000 Austrian Americans lived in the United States, with most coming over during the latter half of the 19th Century, settling primarily in New York, California, Pennsylvania, Florida, New Jersey, and various Midwestern states like Ohio and Illinois. Over 60% of these immigrants came from Burgenland.

World War I and World War II 
In 1917, the United States declared war on the Austro-Hungarian Empire alongside the German Empire after being drawn into the First World War. The war caused diplomatic relations between the United States and the Austro-Hungarian Empire to be terminated on April 8, 1917 and caused a dramatic decrease in Austrian immigration to the United States.

The Treaty of Saint-Germain-en-Laye, negotiated between the Allies and Austria following the war, officially dissolved the Austro-Hungarian Empire and created the First Austrian Republic. The United States never ratified the Treaty of Saint-Germaine-en-Laye. Instead, the United States negotiated its own peace treaty with Austria in 1921. The United States officially recognized the independence of the First Austrian Republic on August 24, 1921.

Nazi Germany annexed the First Austrian Republic in March 1938 in an event known as the Anschluss. The United States closed its legation to Austria on April 30, 1938. Following World War II, the United States and the Allies occupied Austria from 1945 to 1955. The occupation ended when the Allies signed the Austrian State Treaty, which re-established Austria as a sovereign state, creating the modern-day country of the Second Austrian Republic.

The U.S. played an important role in Austria's reconstruction after World War II, via the Marshall Plan.

History of relations since World War II 

Vienna has frequently been chosen as the venue of key superpower summit meetings, like the Vienna summit in June 1961, with U.S. President John F. Kennedy and Soviet Premier Nikita Khrushchev, or the SALT II agreement in June 1979, with U.S. President Jimmy Carter and Soviet General Secretary Leonid Brezhnev.

In February 1984, the President of Austria Rudolf Kirchschläger paid a state visit to the United States. It was the first state visit of an Austrian President to the United States.

In September 1995, U.S. President Bill Clinton invited the President of Austria Thomas Klestil for a working visit to Washington, D.C., which took place on October 19.

On June 21, 2006, U.S. President George W. Bush held bilateral talks with the President of Austria Heinz Fischer at the Hofburg Imperial Palace in Vienna, together with U.S. Secretary of State Condoleezza Rice and Foreign Minister of Austria Ursula Plassnik, shortly before a US-European Union summit.

President Barack Obama met Chancellor Werner Faymann when Obama visited Prague on April 5, 2009.

President Donald Trump met with Chancellor Sebastian Kurz for a bilateral meeting in February 2019 with the aim of "revitalizing the bilateral relationship between the United States and exploring new avenues for transatlantic cooperation...look[ing] to address both global conflicts and those in the European neighborhood, promote economic prosperity, and strengthen energy security."

U.S. and Austrian troops fought side by side during the NATO intervention in Bosnia and Herzegovina and in Kosovo (despite the fact that Austria is not a part of NATO). Both the United States and Austria were involved in the War in Afghanistan.

According to the 2012 U.S. Global Leadership Report, 31% of Austrians approve of U.S. leadership, with 40% disapproving and 29% uncertain.

See also 
 Austrian Americans
 Foreign relations of Austria
 Foreign relations of the United States
 Journal of Austrian-American History

References

Further reading
 Frank, Allison. "The Petroleum War of 1910: Standard Oil, Austria, and the Limits of the Multinational Corporation," American Historical Review (2009) 114#1  pp. 16–41 in JSTOR
 Frank, Tibor. Ethnicity, propaganda, myth-making: Studies on Hungarian connections to Britain and America, 1848-1945 (Akademiai Kiads, 1999)
 Horcicka, Vaclav. "On the Brink of War: The Crisis Year of 1915 in Relations Between the US and Austria-Hungary," Diplomacy & Statecraft (2008) 19#2 pp 187–209.  Online. DOI: 10.1080/09592290802096216.3 
 Nugent, Walter. "Migration from the German and Austro-Hungarian empires to North America." in The Cambridge survey of world migration (1995) pp: 103–108.
 Phelps, Nicole M.  U.S.-Habsburg Relations from 1815 to the Paris Peace Conference (2013) online review
 Schmidl, Erwin A. "Lukewarm Neutrality in a Cold War? The Case of Austria." Journal of Cold War Studies 18.4 (2016): 36-50. online

 Spaulding, Ernest Wilder. The quiet invaders: The story of the Austrian impact upon America (Österreichischer Bundesverlag, 1968)
 Steidl, Annemarie et al. From a Multiethnic Empire to a Nation of Nations: Austro-Hungarian Migrants in the US, 1870–1940 (Innsbruck: Studien Verlag, 2017). 354 pp. 

 Trommler, Frank. "Austria Past, Austria Present: Stages of Scholarship in the American University." Monatshefte 111.1 (2019): 1-18. online

 Wagnleitner, Reinhold, and Diana M. Wolf. Coca-colonization and the Cold War: the cultural mission of the United States in Austria after the Second World War (University of North Carolina Press, 1994)
 Zivojinovic, Dragan R. "The Vatican, Woodrow Wilson, And The Dissolution Of The Hapsburg Monarchy 1914-1918," East European Quarterly (1969) 3#1 pp 31–70.

Primary sources
 U.S. Department of State. Foreign Relations of the United States, 1955-1957. Vol. 5: Austrian State Treaty; Summit and Foreign Ministers Meetings, 1955 (1992)

External links
History of Austria - U.S. relations

 
Bilateral relations of the United States
United States